Wells most commonly refers to:

 Wells, Somerset, a cathedral city in Somerset, England
 Well, an excavation or structure created in the ground
 Wells (name)

Wells may also refer to:

Places

Canada
Wells, British Columbia

England
 Wells (Priory Road) railway station was a railway station in Wells, Somerset
 Wells (Tucker Street) railway station was a railway station in Wells, Somerset
 Wells (UK Parliament constituency), the UK parliamentary constituency in which the city of Wells, Somerset, is located
 Wells-next-the-Sea, town and port in Norfolk
 Wells-on-Sea railway station was a railway station in Wells-next-the-Sea

Scotland
 Wells, Roxburghshire, a Scottish feudal barony

United States
Wells, California, former name of Keene, California
Wells, Indiana
Wells, Kansas
Wells, Maine
Wells, Minnesota
Wells, Mississippi
Wells, Nevada
Wells, New York, a town
Wells (CDP), New York, a census-designated place in the town
Wells, Texas
Wells, Vermont, a New England town
Wells (CDP), Vermont, the main village in the town
Wells, West Virginia
Wells, Wisconsin, a town
Wells, Manitowoc County, Wisconsin, an unincorporated community
Wells County (disambiguation)
Wells Island, West Virginia 
Wells Township (disambiguation)

People
 

 Wells baronets, a member of the Order of Baronets with the surname Wells
 Bishop of Bath and Wells

Other uses
 Charles Wells Ltd, a vertically integrated British regional brewer
 HMS Wells (I95), a British naval fighting ship
 Struell Wells, a set of four holy wells in Struell, Northern Ireland
 Wells and Fakenham Railway was a railway line in Norfolk, England
 Wells Cathedral, in Wells, Somerset
 Wells City F.C., a football club based in Wells, Somerset 
 Wells College, a liberal arts college in New York
 Wells Fargo, an American bank
 Wells light, a large oil-fuelled blowlamp 
 Wells notice, a notification of enforcement by the U.S. Securities and Exchange Commission
 Wells Regional Transportation Center is a train and bus station in Wells, Maine 
 Wells score, one of two prediction rules in clinical medicine
 Wells turbine, a low-pressure air turbine 
 1721 Wells, an asteroid
 Wells (crater), an impact crater on Mars
 Wells Vertige, a British sports car

See also 
 Justice Wells (disambiguation)
 Well (disambiguation)
 Welles (disambiguation)
 Wels (disambiguation)